Harriet Dart (born 28 July 1996) is a British professional tennis player.

Dart entered the WTA top 100 for the first time in March 2022 and achieved her career-high singles ranking of 84 on 25 July 2022. She also has a career-high doubles ranking of No. 92, achieved April 2019. She reached the final of the 2021 Wimbledon Championships in mixed doubles with Joe Salisbury.

Dart has won one doubles title on WTA 125 tournaments, and also four singles and 14 doubles titles on the ITF Women's Circuit. She made her WTA Tour debut at the 2015 Eastbourne International.

Personal life
Dart was born in Hampstead, London and attended The Royal School. Her mother is a teacher and her father is a surveyor.

She started playing tennis aged seven, her favourite surfaces are hardcourt and grass.

Professional career

2018
Dart began playing at ITF events where she beat Freya Christie, Laura Pigossi, Nastja Kolar, Conny Perrin before she reached the final of an ITF event in Germany and beat Karolína Muchová to win her first 2018 title. She reached another final in Japan but lost to Veronika Kudermetova. In Eastbourne, she won against Kristýna Plíšková before losing to then-top 10, Anastasija Sevastova. In Wimbledon, she lost her first match against former world No. 1, Karolina Plíšková, although taking a set off Plíšková and forcing a tiebreak in the first set. At an ITF event in Norway, she won another title; Paula Badosa retired in the final.

2019
At the Australian Open, she lost to Maria Sharapova in the first round without winning a single game. On 30 March, Dart and her doubles partner Lesley Kerkhove won the final of the Open de Seine-et-Marne against Sarah Beth Grey and Eden Silva. At the Wimbledon Championships, Dart beat both Christina McHale and Beatriz Haddad Maia, progressing to the third round where she lost to Ashleigh Barty only winning two games. In August, Dart qualified for the US Open for the first time in her career; she lost in the first round to Ana Bogdan, 3–6, 1–6.

2022
Dart made a significant breakthrough at Indian Wells. Having come through qualifying, she reached the last 16, including a win over Elina Svitolina, her first win over a top 20 player before losing to Madison Keys. The points she gained took her into the top 100 of the rankings for the first time. After a lack of success on clay, Dart entered the Nottingham Open where she defeated Donna Vekić and Camila Giorgi before she lost her first WTA event quarterfinal to Alison Riske. She then entered the Birmingham Classic where she defeated Camila Osorio before losing to Simona Halep. At the Eastbourne International, she beat Madison Brengle, Jil Teichmann and Marta Kostyuk, before losing to Petra Kvitová in the quarterfinal. On 25 July, she rose to 84 in the WTA rankings, her highest ever position. At the US Open, she secured her first top-10 win, beating Daria Kasatkina in the first round in three sets. She exited the tournament in the second round, losing to Dalma Gálfi in straight sets.

Performance timelines

Only main-draw results in WTA Tour, Grand Slam tournaments, Fed Cup/Billie Jean King Cup and Olympic Games are included in win–loss records.

Singles
Current after the 2023 ATX Open.

Doubles

Significant finals

Grand Slam tournament finals

Mixed doubles: 1 (1 runner-up)

WTA career finals

Doubles: 1 (1 runner-up)

WTA Challenger finals

Doubles: 1 (1 title)

ITF Circuit finals

Singles: 12 (4 titles, 8 runner–ups)

Doubles: 28 (14 titles, 14 runner–ups)

Fed Cup/Billie Jean King Cup participation

Singles (1–3)

Doubles (2–1)

Top 10 wins

Notes

References

External links

 
 
 
 
 
 Lawn Tennis Association profile

1996 births
Living people
British female tennis players
Tennis people from Greater London
English female tennis players
People educated at The Royal School, Hampstead